"Leaked" is a single by American rapper Lil Tjay, released on September 6, 2018 by Columbia Records. It appears on his debut studio album True 2 Myself (2019), which also features the official remix of the song, featuring American rapper Lil Wayne. In the song, Lil Tjay sing-raps about his rise to fame as a rapper.

Critical reception
In a review of True 2 Myself on HipHopDX, Daniel Spielberger wrote, "Though 'Leaked' is a tad more upbeat, it's monotonous and fails to hit an emotional crescendo."

Music video
A music video for the remix was released on December 20, 2019 and was directed by Gil Green. It is set in a circus-themed carnival, where Lil Tjay and Lil Wayne have a party under a tent, surrounded by female dancers.

Charts

Certifications

References

2018 singles
2018 songs
Lil Tjay songs
Columbia Records singles
Songs written by Lil Tjay